Ficus schippii is a species of plant in the family Moraceae. It is found in Bolivia, Brazil, and Peru.

References

schippii
Least concern plants
Taxonomy articles created by Polbot
Trees of Peru